Krøderen may refer to:
 Krøderen (lake) in Norway
 Krøderen (village) in Norway